Bum is the name of several locations in Afghanistan.

The first of these is a village in the northeastern part of Khakrez Valley, about 36 miles north of Kandahar. Around the turn of the 20th century, it was reported as containing around 40 Alikozai households.

It is also the name given to the part of the Khakrez Valley in which the village lies. There has more recently been another village with this name reported.

See also
Kandahar Province

References

Valleys of Afghanistan
Populated places in Kandahar Province
Landforms of Kandahar Province